The Time of Indifference is a 2020 Italian drama film directed by Leonardo Guerra Seràgnoli.

The film is an adaptation of the 1929 novel of the same name by Alberto Moravia. It was released in Italy on 24 November 2020.

Cast

References

External links

2020 films
2020s Italian-language films
2020 drama films
Italian drama films
2020s Italian films
Films based on works by Alberto Moravia